PSI-6130 is an experimental treatment for hepatitis C. PSI-6130 is a member of a class of antiviral drugs known as nucleoside polymerase inhibitors that was created by chemist Jeremy L. Clark.  Specifically, PSI-6130 inhibits the hepatitis C virus RNA dependant RNA polymerase called NS5B.

PSI-6130 is currently being developed by Hoffmann–La Roche as a 3',5'-diisobutyrl ester prodrug, R7128.  R7128 is part of the combination of all-oral agents clinical trial known as INFORM-1.

References 

Nucleosides
Pyrimidones
NS5B (polymerase) inhibitors